The Liga Portugal (Portugal League), also known by its acronym LPFP, is a governing body that manages professional football club competitions in Portugal. It was founded in 1978 as Liga Portuguesa dos Clubes de Futebol Profissional and works as an autonomous organism under the authority of the Portuguese Football Federation. In 1991, it changed its name to Liga Portuguesa de Futebol Professional and in the year 2020, changed the name into the current one. 

The LP is responsible for the organisation and supervision of the top two leagues – the Primeira Liga and the Liga Portugal 2 – and of the Taça da Liga, a knockout cup competition limited to the clubs competing in these professional leagues (except reserve or B teams).

The current president is former Portuguese international referee Pedro Proença, in office since 28 July 2015.

List of presidents
Presidents of LPCFP (1978–1991)
 João Aranha (1978–1980)
 Lito Gomes de Almeida (1980–1989)
 Valentim Loureiro (1989–1991)

Presidents of LPFP (1991–2020)
 Valentim Loureiro (1991–1994)
 Manuel Damásio interim (1994–1995)
 Pinto da Costa (1995–1996)
 Valentim Loureiro (1996–2006)
 Hermínio Loureiro (2006–2010)
 Fernando Gomes (2010–2011)
 Mário Figueiredo (2012–2015)
 Luís Duque (2014–2015)
 Pedro Proença (2015–2020)

Presidents of LP (2020 – present)

 Pedro Proença (2021 – present)

See also
LPFP Awards
LPFP Primeira Liga Player of the Year

References

External links
LPFP

Football leagues in Portugal
2
Primeira Liga
Liga Portugal 2